Shampoo were an English female pop music duo in the 1990s, formed by Jacqueline "Jacqui" Blake (born 23 November 1974 in Woolwich) and Caroline "Carrie" Askew (born 4 May 1977 in Plumstead). Their 1994 song "Trouble" reached number 11 in the UK Singles Chart and was featured in 1995's Mighty Morphin Power Rangers: The Movie.

History
Jacqui Blake and Carrie Askew were best friends at Plumstead Manor School, a secondary school for girls in Plumstead, London. In the early nineties they started writing Last Exit, a fanzine for the Manic Street Preachers, and later appeared in the video for "Little Baby Nothing". They also wrote a fanzine for Fabulous.

During this time they formed Shampoo, the name deriving from their schoolyard nickname of 'the shampoo girls', for claiming to be 'washing their hair' when turning down date requests.

Their first single, "Blisters and Bruises" (co-written by Lawrence of the bands Felt and Denim) with the B-sides "Paydirt" and "I Love Little Pussy", was released by Icerink records (a short-lived label created by Saint Etienne's Bob Stanley and Pete Wiggs) on 7" pink vinyl in 1993. This and their following single, "Bouffant Headbutt", received favourable reviews in the music press, such as the NME and Melody Maker, but sold few copies.

Whilst their first two singles were typical of the riot grrrl bands coming to notice, the following year saw the release of "Trouble" and the album We Are Shampoo, which displayed a more radio-friendly sound, but still with much of their previous abrasiveness: "Dirty Old Love Song" panned Mariah Carey and Whitney Houston (whose "I Will Always Love You" had been the previous year's biggest-selling single in the UK).  "Shiny Black Taxi Cab" was about a night on the town gone wrong (ending with a spoken section by the 'taxi driver' complaining to a new passenger about two drunken girls who had thrown up all over his cab the previous week). We Are Shampoo sold over a million copies, with the majority of sales in Japan and the rest of Asia.

"Trouble" reached No. 11 on the UK charts, landing the group on Top of the Pops and the cover of Smash Hits magazine. For the remainder of 1994 Shampoo did well, finding fans in both the mainstream and alternative music scenes – boosted in part by their links to Manic Street Preachers fanscene. The band became moderately successful in Japan. "Trouble" was included in the 1995 film Mighty Morphin Power Rangers: The Movie and also appeared on the film's soundtrack. It also appeared in the 1996 film Foxfire and the 1997 film Trojan War. The Britpop single "Delicious" reached No. 21 in the UK in February 1995. It is also played in the 1997 film Casper: A Spirited Beginning. The song "Don't Call Me Babe" was included in the soundtrack of the 1996 film Barb Wire. 

In July 1996, one week before the Spice Girls debuted on the UK Singles Chart with "Wannabe", the duo charted with a song called "Girl Power". However, this song peaked at number 25 and was only on the chart for four weeks, meaning by the time they released their second album, also called Girl Power, their sales were in decline. In September 1996, they released a cover of the Waitresses' "I Know What Boys Like", which became their last chart entry, peaking at number 42. After the Girl Power album failed to reach the UK Albums Chart, the duo separated from Food Records and the third Shampoo album Absolute Shampoo was released solely on the Internet in 2000, due to an inability to acquire a recording contract. The duo disbanded shortly afterwards.

Shampoo often cited their main influences as being the Sex Pistols, Gary Numan and the Beastie Boys, whilst also claiming to be huge fans of East 17 and Take That. Shampoo covered Numan's song "Cars" on the B-side of their "Girl Power" single, while a cover of East 17's "House of Love" was included on their debut album.

In May 2007 the album We Are Shampoo was re-issued in the UK with bonus tracks of the B-sides.

Discography

The discography of Shampoo consists of four studio albums, two compilation albums and ten singles.

Studio albums

Compilation albums

Singles

All Japanese figures are from the Oricon Singles Chart.

Video
 We Are Shampoo (1995) – Japanese video collection containing videos for "Trouble", "Viva La Megababes", "Delicious" & "Bouffant Headbutt".
 There are two different videos for "Trouble". The original features the girls trying to get home from central London after a night out. The re-make features new footage of the girls singing to the camera, intercut with film footage from Mighty Morphin Power Rangers: The Movie.

Books
 Delicious (1995, Japanese book)

Use of audio in other media
"Trouble" appears on the soundtracks to Mighty Morphin Power Rangers: The Movie (1995), Foxfire (1996)  and Jawbreaker (1999). The song is sung by characters in the film Blackrock (1997). It is featured in the closing credits of the seventh episode of Zapped, and is also featured in the film Trojan War (1997).
"Don't Call Me Babe" appears in the film Barb Wire (1996) and on its soundtrack, and also appears in Jawbreaker (1999).
"Delicious" appears on the Casper: A Spirited Beginning (1997) soundtrack.
Shampoo provided voices for the PlayStation puzzle game Spin Jam (2000).
"Girl Power" is featured in the film Sugar & Spice (2001).

Covers by other acts
"Trouble" was covered by Carter the Unstoppable Sex Machine, and can be found as a B-side on their "The Young Offenders Mum" single. It was also sung by the cast of the 2007 film St Trinian's and featured on the film's soundtrack. In 2009, Japanese rock band Vamps included a cover of the song as a B-side to their single "I Gotta Kick Start Now". That same year, Zebrahead also included a version on their cover album, Panty Raid. In 2021, Miley Cyrus recorded a cover of the song "Delicious" for use in a Gucci commercial.

References

All-female punk bands
Musical groups established in 1993
Musical groups disestablished in 2000
1993 establishments in England
2000 disestablishments in England
20th-century English women singers
20th-century English singers
EMI Records artists
English pop girl groups
English pop music duos
English pop punk groups
Female musical duos
Musical groups from the Royal Borough of Greenwich
Parlophone artists
British rock girl groups
Rock music duos